Hajaz Akram (born January 1970) is a British actor. Principal and founder of the Hampstead Academy of Acting & Drama, Akram has trained and worked as an actor, teacher and director for 20 years. He was previously the founder of the Academy Of Asian And Ethic Dramatic Arts, the aim of which was to offer actor training to Asian actors. In 2015 Akram co-founded the charity Shout At Cancer.

He studied Modern Drama Studies at Brunel University London.

Filmography
He has appeared in numerous television dramas including Doctor Who, Murder in Mind and Casualty, and is also the voice of DJ Panjit Gavaskar (Radio Del Mundo) in Grand Theft Auto: Liberty City Stories.

He has had film roles in Lara Croft Tomb Raider: The Cradle of Life, Angel of Death: The Beverly Allitt Story, and Queen Victoria's Men.

References

External links
 
 Hampstead Academy of Acting & Drama

British male voice actors
British male film actors
British male television actors
Male actors from London
Place of birth missing (living people)
Alumni of Brunel University London
Alumni of the Royal Central School of Speech and Drama
Living people
1970 births